"Cloud Number Nine" (sometimes spelled as "Cloud #9" or "Cloud Number 9") is a song by Canadian singer-songwriter Bryan Adams. It was released on May 3, 1999, as the third single from his eighth studio album, On a Day Like Today (1998). The single version is notable for being one of the few remixes Bryan Adams released with British musician Chicane. "Cloud Number Nine" reached number six on the UK Singles Chart, number seven in Canada, and number 13 in Austria.

Versions

Album version
The song was first released on Adams' 1998 album On a Day Like Today, and is the only release where it appears in its original form. It was produced by Bob Rock and mixed by Adams' longtime collaborator, Bob Clearmountain.

Demo version
A demo version of the song appears on the CD single "The Best of Me", released in November 1999, following the chart run of the Chicane Mix. It features a prominent beat throughout the recording, provided by co-writer Max Martin. He used a similar beat on his early productions for Britney Spears. Also, the released demo version had a longer first verse than the one ending up on the album and all other subsequent versions. According to co-writer Gretchen Peters, who wrote most of the song's lyrics, it was Adams' decision to scrap the lines.

Chicane Mix
It was remixed by British electronic artist Chicane, with synthesizers added, as well as a drum sample from Gota Yashiki's "Groove Activator". It was released as a single in May 1999 in Europe. The single reached number 6 in the UK Singles Chart, and became a top 10 hit in Ibiza. Chicane said upon its release in 1999, he'd turned down a previous offer of remixing a Bryan Adams single, due to a lack of time. Chicane later worked with Adams on the songs "Don't Give Up", "East Side Story", and "She's Got a Way".

Chicane's mix of the song was featured on Bryan Adams' compilation album The Best of Me, however simply titled "Cloud Number Nine". It appeared again on his 2005 Anthology album, this time correctly titled as "Cloud Number Nine (Chicane Mix)". The Chicane Mix has become the standard live version for Adams. In 2000, Chicane joined Adams onstage to perform this song and "Don't Give Up", as can be seen on the DVD Live At Slane Castle.

Bascombe Mix
Among the versions considered for a radio edit of "Cloud Number Nine", was a remix made by Dave Bascombe. The Bascombe Mix eventually ended up on the second CD of the UK single and hasn't appeared anywhere else since its release.

Live versions
Adams performed "Cloud Number Nine" live in a three piece setting during his extensive world tour, starting in 1999, with a stage set and costume designs mimicking the music video to the song. Live recordings of the song ended up on several CD and DVD releases in the next few years. Most versions are based on the Chicane Mix, at one time even performing it with Chicane himself. The song was performed during most subsequent tours, although most commonly with a full band setting.

Music video
The music video made for this single, features mainly the color white. Adams is dressed in all white, in a white room with an Asian woman who is body painted all white. Various images and things that are white are featured in the video such as milk, white paint, eggs, a dove, and a white dog. The video contains several elements seen in Adams' previous music video, "When You're Gone" - most notably the tape recorder and the apples. While being reviewed on the Saturday morning show Live & Kicking on BBC 1, dance producer Norman Cook commented: "The most positive thing I can say about it, is that it's very white."

Track listings

UK CD1
 "Cloud #9" (Chicane Mix)
 "Let's Talk About Love"
 "When You're Gone" (acoustic version featuring Melanie C)

UK CD2
 "Cloud #9" (Chicane Mix)
 "Cloud #9" (Bascombe Mix)
 Snippets ("C'mon C'mon"/"Inside Out"/"Where Angels Fear to Tread")

European CD single
 "Cloud #9" (Chicane Mix)
 "Let's Talk About Love"

Australian CD single
 "Cloud #9" (Chicane Mix)
 "Let's Talk About Love"
 "When You're Gone" (acoustic version)
 Snippets ("C'mon C'mon"/"Inside Out"/"Where Angels Fear to Tread")

Charts

Weekly charts

Year-end charts

References

1998 songs
1999 singles
A&M Records singles
Bryan Adams songs
Canadian soft rock songs
Mercury Records singles
Song recordings produced by Bob Rock
Songs written by Bryan Adams
Songs written by Gretchen Peters
Songs written by Max Martin